Georgy Iosifovich Bondar (1893 – March 10, 1939) was a Soviet komkor (corps commander). He fought for the Imperial Russian Army before going over to the Bolsheviks during the subsequent civil war. During the Great Purge, he was arrested on August 25, 1938, and executed the following year.

Military career
In 1918-1919 he was commander of the light fleet of the 2nd artillery brigade, in 1919-1920 he was commander of an artillery battery, commander of a light artillery battalion. In 1921 he graduated from the Higher Artillery School. From 1921 to 1925 he was commander of the artillery battalion of the 15th rifle division, chief of artillery of the 23rd rifle division, from 1925 to 1928 he was inspector of artillery and armored forces of the Red Army, chief of artillery of the Volga Military District. In 1929, he was commander of the 48th Rifle Division, chairman of the Artillery Committee of the Artillery Directorate of the Red Army, head of the scientific and technical directorate of the Artillery Directorate of the Red Army, in 1929-1930 he was head of the Artillery Directorate of the Red Army. In 1930-1932 he was a student of the Special Group of the Frunze Military Academy. In 1932-1937 he was commander of the 17th Rifle Division, from May to November 1937 he was Deputy Head of the Artillery Directorate of the Red Army, from November 1937 to August 1938 he was Deputy People's Commissar of the Defense Industry of the USSR.

Repression and rehabilitation
He was arrested on August 25, 1938, sentenced by the All-Union Military Commission of the USSR on March 10, 1939, to death on charges of participating in a counter-revolutionary terrorist organization and shot on the same day. He was rehabilitated posthumously on June 25, 1956.

References

1893 births
1939 deaths
People from Kaluga
People from Kaluga Governorate
Communist Party of the Soviet Union members
Members of the Supreme Soviet of the Russian Soviet Federative Socialist Republic, 1938–1947
Bondar
Imperial Russian Army officers
Russian military personnel of World War I
Soviet military personnel of the Russian Civil War
Recipients of the Order of the Red Banner
Great Purge victims from Russia
People executed by the Soviet Union
Soviet rehabilitations